Duke of Lécera is a hereditary title in the Peerage of Spain accompanied by the dignity of Grandee, granted in 1493 by Ferdinand II of Aragon to Juan Fernández de Híjar.

The title makes reference to the small town of Lécera in Zaragoza, Spain.

Dukes of Lécera (1493)

 Juan Fernández de Híjar y Cabrera, 1st Duke of Lécera
 Luis Fernández de Híjar y Beaumont, 2nd Duke of Lécera
 Juan Francisco Fernández de Hijar, 3rd Duke of Lécera	
 Isabel Margarita Fernández de Híjar y Castro-Pinós, 4th Duchess of Lécera	
 Jaime Francisco Sarmiento de Silva, 5th Duke of Lécera	
 Juana Petronila de Silva y Aragón, 6th Duchess of Lécera	
 Isidro Francisco Fernández de Híjar y Silva, 7th Duke of Lécera	
 Joaquín Diego de Silva y Moncada, 8th Duke of Lécera	
 Pedro de Alcántara Fernández de Híjar y Abarca de Bolea, 9th Duke of Lécera	
 Agustín Pedro de Silva y Palafox, 10th Duke of Lécera	
 Francisca Javiera de Silva y Fitz-James Stuart, 11th Duchess of Lécera	
 José Rafael de Silva Fernández de Híjar y Palafox, 12th Duke of Lécera
 Cayetano de Silva y Fernández de Córdoba, 13th Duke of Lécera	
 Agustín de Silva y Bernuy, 14th Duke of Lécera	
 Jaime de Silva y Campbell, 15th Duke of Lécera	
 Jaime de Silva y Mitjans, 16th Duke of Lécera
 Jaime de Silva y Agrela, 17th Duke of Lécera	
 Jaime de Silva y Mora, 18th Duke of Lécera
 Leticia de Silva y Allende, 19th Duchess of Lécera

See also
List of dukes in the peerage of Spain
List of current Grandees of Spain

References

Bibliography
 

Dukedoms of Spain
Grandees of Spain
Lists of dukes
Lists of Spanish nobility